Ganesh Chandru Gaonkar is an Indian politician. He was elected to the Goa Legislative Assembly from Sanvordem in the 2022 Goa Legislative Assembly election as a member of the Bharatiya Janata Party.

References

1958 births
Living people
Goa MLAs 2022–2027
People from South Goa district
Goa MLAs 2012–2017
Bharatiya Janata Party politicians from Goa